Ljubomir Aličić (born 2 November 1955), known by his stage name Ljuba Aličić, is a Serbian and former FPR-Yugoslavian folk singer.

His career has been lasting more than five decades.

His biggest hit is the 2003 single-song "Ciganin sam, al’ najlepši".

References

External links

1955 births
Living people
Musicians from Šabac
Serbian folk singers
Serbian folk-pop singers
Grand Production artists
Serbian Romani people
Romani singers
20th-century Serbian male singers
21st-century Serbian male singers